The Luxembourg Hockey League, formally known as the Luxembourg Championship is the national ice hockey championship in Luxembourg. It was first contested in 1993, and was held annually from 1998-2003. The Alter Domus Cup is the current national competition in Luxembourg.

Champions  

2021-22: Beaufort Knights
2002–03: Tornado Luxembourg
2001–02: Tornado Luxembourg
2000–01: Tornado Luxembourg
1999–2000: Tornado Luxembourg
1998–99: Tornado Luxembourg
1997–98: Tornado Luxembourg
1994-1997: Not played
1993–94: Tornado Luxembourg

References

External links 
Luxembourg Ice Hockey Federation

  
Defunct ice hockey leagues in Europe
Ice hockey competitions in Luxembourg
Defunct sports leagues in Luxembourg
1994 establishments in Luxembourg
2003 disestablishments in Luxembourg
Sports leagues established in 1994
Sports leagues disestablished in 2003